Naan Sonnathey Sattam is a 1988 Indian Tamil-language action film, starring Charan Raj and Rekha. The film, produced by Sri Manthralaya Chitralaya, was released on 29 July 1988.

Plot 

Kaali is a rowdy that's in and out of jail. Aasha is a social worker that runs a sewing factory for disadvantaged women. The factory was built on government land approved through proper channels. Nagalingam is a rich, influential smuggler that has plans for the land. He hires Kaali to close the factory causing friction between Kaali and Aasha. He attempts to kill Aasha and is saved by inspector David.

In a twist, Aasha refuses to press charges against Kaali as she feels even he is not beyond redemption. Moved by her faith in him, Kaali vows to only use violence in helping people. This new attitude pits him against Nagalingam as well as his younger brother Aalavandhan. Aasha wants Kaali to become a pacifist. Kaali explains his path to rowdyism began with his father's arrest and hanging for a crime he did not commit. Kaali's widowed mother struggles to put him through college but falls ill. He turns to crime to get the money to save her life and is arrested which sets him on a path to criminality. Having fallen in love with Aasha, Kaali agrees to her request to give up violence.

Ponni, a young woman who loves Kaali, tells him of Aasha's closeness to her old collegemate, Ashok. Kaali witnesses a close moment between the two and is heartbroken believing the two to be in love. Still, he rejects Ponni who marries Sappani. Aalavandhan attempts to assault Ponni on her wedding day resulting in both her and Sappani's death. Kaali is framed for these deaths and arrested again.

While visiting him in prison, Aasha confesses her love for Kaali. Determined to free him, she files a complaint with evidence against Nagalingam and Aalavandhan. They plan to silence her before they're arrested. Kaali is released from jail the for good behavior and embarks on a mission to save Aasha.

Cast 
Charan Raj as Kaali
Rekha as Aasha
Vinu Chakravarthy as Nagalingam
S. S. Chandran as Aalavandhan
Senthil as Kabali
Nassar as Inspector David
Charle as Sappani
Vadivukkarasi as Aasha's mother
Kuyili as Ponni
Prem Anand as Ashok

Soundtrack 
The music was composed by Ilaiyaraaja.

Reception 
The Indian Express noted the film's similarities to Kadalora Kavithaigal (1986) about a woman reforming a violent man, commenting that "while [Kadalora Kavithaigal] had sentimental touches it is action that dominates [Naan Sonnathey Sattam]".

References

External links 
 

1980s Tamil-language films
1988 action films
1988 films
Films scored by Ilaiyaraaja
Indian action films